This is a list of the main career statistics of professional Czech tennis player Kateřina Siniaková. To date, Siniaková has won three singles and twenty-two doubles titles on the WTA Tour, including seven Grand Slam titles: Australian Open (2022, 2023), French Open (2018, 2021), Wimbledon Championships (2018, 2022) and US Open (2022). All these big achievements she made alongside countrymate Barbora Krejčíková. By winning the 2022 US Open, she collected all grand slams ("Career Grand Slam"). In the same time, she achieved "Career Golden Slam" and "Career Super Slam", thanks to previously winning gold at the 2020 Summer Tokyo Olympics and 2021 WTA Finals. Achieving all of this alongside Krejčíková, they became the second women's pair (and the third and fourth women overall, after Gigi Fernández and Pam Shriver) to complete this goal. 

Beside Grand Slam success, in doubles she also won the WTA Finals in 2021, two WTA 1000 titles (one Mandatory - the Madrid Open in 2021 and one non-Mandatory - the Canadian Open in 2019. Despite having less success in singles, she still left her mark. Her most significant results are two quarterfinals at the China Open and Wuhan Open in 2018. At Grand Slam tournaments, she reached the round of 16 at the 2019 French Open, where she also defeated world No. 1, Naomi Osaka, to make her biggest win so far. She also became the No. 1 doubles player on 22 October 2018, while she achieved a career-high singles ranking of world No. 31 on the same day.

Performance timelines

Only main-draw results in WTA Tour, Grand Slam tournaments, Fed Cup/Billie Jean King Cup and Olympic Games are included in win–loss records.

Singles
Current through the 2023 BNP Paribas Open.

Doubles
Current after the 2023 Indian Wells Masters.

Mixed doubles

Grand Slam finals

Doubles: 9 (7 titles, 2 runner-ups)

Other significant finals

Olympic finals

Doubles: 1 (gold medal)

WTA Finals finals

Doubles: 3 (1 title, 2 runner-ups)

WTA 1000 finals

Doubles: 6 (3 titles, 3 runner-ups)

WTA Tour career finals

Singles: 7 (3 titles, 4 runner-ups)

Doubles: 37 (22 titles, 15 runner-ups)

WTA Challenger finals

Doubles: 1 (1 title)

ITF Circuit finals

Singles: 9 (8 titles, 1 runner–up)

Doubles: 7 (4 titles, 3 runner–ups)

Junior Grand Slam finals

Girls' singles: 1 (runner–up)

Girls' doubles: 3 (3 titles)

WTA Tour career earnings
Current through the 2023 Australian Open.
{|cellpadding=3 cellspacing=0 border=1 style=border:#aaa;solid:1px;border-collapse:collapse;text-align:center;
|-style=background:#eee;font-weight:bold
|width="90"|Year
|width="100"|Grand Slam <br/ >titles|width="100"|WTA <br/ >titles
|width="100"|Total <br/ >titles
|width="120"|Earnings ($)
|width="100"|Money list rank
|-
|2014
|0
|1
|1
| align="right" |145,519
|148
|-
|2015
|0
|1
|1
| align="right" |358,870
|86
|-
|2016
|0
|0
|0
| align="right" |611,431
|55
|-
|2017
|0
|2
|2
| align="right" |1,072,694
|35
|-
|2018
|2
|0
|2
| align="right" |2,063,611
| 18
|-
|2019
|0
|3
|3
| align="right" |1,350,132
|29
|-
|2020
|0
|1
|1
| align="right" |568,261
|31
|-
|2021
|1
|5
|6
| align="right" |1,244,914
|25
|-
|2022
|3
|4
|7
|align=right|1,739,265
|17
|-
|2023
|1
|0
|1
|align=right|344,921
|16
|- style="font-weight:bold;"
|Career
|7
|17
|24
| align="right" |9,555,431
|67
|}

Career Grand Slam statistics
Grand Slam tournament seedings
The tournaments won by Siniaková are in boldface', and advanced into final by Siniaková are in italics''.

Doubles

Mixed doubles

Best Grand Slam results details

Record against other players

No. 1 wins

Record against top 10 players

 She has a 8–26 record against players who were, at the time the match was played, ranked in the top 10.

Double bagel matches (6–0, 6–0)

Awards

WTA Awards 
 Doubles Team of the year: 2018, 2021 and 2022 (alongside Kateřina Siniaková)

See also 

 Krejčíková–Siniaková doubles team

Notes

References

Siniaková, Kateřina